Dawn Raid Entertainment is a record label based in Papatoetoe, South Auckland, in New Zealand. It has signed many New Zealand Hip-hop and R&B artists such as Savage, Adeaze, Aaradhna, The Deceptikonz, Devolo and Ill Semantics.
The founders of Dawn Raid Entertainment announced the closure of the recording label on 19 April 2007 due to liquidation.

By June 2007, due to new owners, the label started operating again. Artists represented include Savage, Mareko, The Deceptikonz, Horsemen Family, Sweet & Irie.  

At its peak, Dawn Raid Entertainment was home to many gold and platinum-selling New Zealand hip hop and R&B artists.

History
School friends Danny "Brotha D" Leaosavai'i and Andy Murnane founded Dawn Raid Entertainment in 1999. The label's name was a reference to the dawn raids of the 1970s and 1980s that disproportionately targeted members of the Pacific community in New Zealand. They started selling T-shirts at a market in Otara to raise capital. In 2007, the label went into liquidation for a few months.

In 2020, Oscar Kightley directed the documentary Dawn Raid, to be distributed by Universal and released in New Zealand cinemas on 21 January 2021.

Sponsorship
In May 2004, Dawn Raid became a sponsor for the Telecom subsidiary company Boost Mobile and released a single Hook Up featuring both the prominent and the unknown talent of Dawn Raid Entertainment.  Currently, Hook Up is still the theme for Boost Mobile with some of their signed musicians doing voiceovers for the ads.

Label Artists
Monsta Ganjah (The Regime)
Savage
Sweet & Irie (Reggae Band)
Devolo
Aaradhna
Adeaze
 FRISKO
Brotha D
Deceptikonz
 DJ Peter Gunz & Tikelz
Horsemen Family
Mareko
Ill Semantics
DJCXL
R.E.S.
K.A.O.S.

Discography

Albums
The following is a list of albums and singles released under the Dawn Raid label.
The first album released under Dawn Raid was a compilation titled Southside Story which was released in April 2000 and featured undiscovered artists such as Ill Semantics, 4 Corners, Native Sons, K.A.O.S., Adeaze, Live Live and the co-founder of Dawn Raid, Brotha D.

Singles

See also
 Lists of record labels

References

http://www.dawnraid.co.nz
https://web.archive.org/web/20110720114400/http://www.dawnraid.co.nz/DAWN-RAID_SMC-DEAL-PR.pdf
https://web.archive.org/web/20110720114422/http://www.dawnraid.co.nz/SavagePressUniversal.pdf
[PDF] UNIVERSAL REPUBLIC RECORDS SIGNS MULTIPLATINUM SOUTH AUCKLAND, NEW ...
File Format: PDF/Adobe Acrobat - Quick View
12 May 2008 ... UNIVERSAL REPUBLIC RECORDS SIGNS MULTIPLATINUM ... Dawn Raid and Savage have entered into a deal for Universal Republic to helm the project ...
www.dawnraid.co.nz/SavagePressUniversal.pdf - Similar

External links
 Official site
 
 New Management

 
New Zealand record labels
Record labels established in 1999
Hip hop record labels
New Zealand hip hop
IFPI members
1999 establishments in New Zealand